Sean Porter is an American cinematographer. Growing up in Gig Harbor, Washington, he graduated from the University of Washington in 2004. He has worked on films such as It Felt Like Love, Kumiko, the Treasure Hunter, and Green Room. In 2014, he was listed on Filmmakers "25 New Faces of Independent Film", as well as IndieWires "Cinematographers to Watch" and Complexs "Underrated Cinematographers Poised to Make It Big in 2015". In 2015, he was listed on Varietys "10 Cinematographers to Watch".

Filmography
Feature films
 Sweet Crude (2009)
 Bass Ackwards (2010)
 Eden (2012)
 Grassroots (2012)
 It Felt Like Love (2013)
 Kumiko, the Treasure Hunter (2014)
 Green Room (2015)
 The Trust (2016)
 20th Century Women (2016)
 Rough Night (2017)
 Green Book (2018)
 The Greatest Beer Run Ever (2022)

Awards
 2014 Tallgrass Film Festival: Outstanding Cinematography (Kumiko, the Treasure Hunter)

References

External links
 

Year of birth missing (living people)
Living people
American cinematographers
University of Washington alumni